Prior's Heys is a former civil parish, now in the parish of Tarvin, in the Borough of Cheshire West and Chester and ceremonial county of Cheshire in England. In 2001 it had a population of 10. The civil parish was abolished in 2015 and merged into Tarvin.

References

Former civil parishes in Cheshire
Cheshire West and Chester